The 4th Central Committee of the Communist Party of Cuba (CPC) was elected at the 4th CPC Congress in 1991.

Members

References

4th Central Committee of the Communist Party of Cuba
1991 establishments in Cuba
1997 disestablishments in Cuba